Thomas or Tom Lyon may refer to:
Thomas Lyon (settler) (1621–1690), English-born US settler
Thomas Lyon, 8th Earl of Strathmore and Kinghorne (1704–1753), Scottish nobleman, peer, and politician
Thomas Lyon (of Auldbar) (died 1608), Treasurer of Scotland
Thomas Lyon (MP) (1741–1796), Scottish politician and member of Parliament from Aberdeen Burghs
Tom Lyon, British magician
Tom Lyon (footballer) (1915–1998), Scottish footballer
T. Edgar Lyon (Thomas Edgar Lyon, 1903–1978), American educator and historian
Thomas Lyttleton Lyon (1869–1938), professor of soil science at Cornell University

See also
Thomas Lyon House, Greenwich, Connecticut
Thomas Lyons (disambiguation)
Thomas Lyon-Bowes (disambiguation)